David Paul Weber is an American criminalist, and the former Assistant Inspector General for Investigations at the U.S. Securities and Exchange Commission (SEC). He is the Principal Investigator of a $2.6 million grant by the U.S. Department of Health and Human Services, to test various white collar crime interventions concerning elder financial exploitation and high-tech crime.  In the past, Weber was a whistleblower who reported allegations about foreign espionage against the stock exchanges, and misconduct in the Bernard L. Madoff and R. Allen Stanford Ponzi scheme investigations. In June 2013, the SEC settled with Weber his whistleblower protection and U.S. District Court lawsuits, paying him one of the largest federal employee whistleblower settlements ever. In 2014, In Bed with Wall Street author Larry Doyle named Weber as one of his "top 5 whistleblowers". On July 30, 2015, Weber was recognized by six United States Senators and one member of the House of Representatives at the First Congressional Celebration of National Whistleblower Appreciation Day.  On August 5, 2021, Weber met with the President, Speaker of the House, and Senators at the signing of H.R. 3325, the awarding of the Congressional Gold Medal for those officers who lost their lives at the Capitol Insurrection, as he represents one of the deceased police officers and his widow. Weber is now a forensic accounting professor at the Perdue School, Salisbury University. As part of his teaching duties, he is a special investigator for the Maryland State's Attorneys Offices in two adjoining counties, and a Virginia financial crimes state prosecutor in the neighboring Virginia county.  He supervises his students who act as intern investigators on financial crime cases.

Education
Weber graduated from Syracuse University (Criminal Justice; cum laude), Syracuse University College of Law (J.D., magna cum laude), and received his doctoral education at the University of Florida. He was admitted to the New York State bar in 1999, the District of Columbia Bar in 2000, the Maryland Bar in 2013, and the Virginia Bar in 2017. He is a licensed private investigator, with firearms authority, in the Commonwealth of Virginia, certified by the Virginia Department of Criminal Justice Services, a forensic accountant, and a certified fraud examiner.

Career

Early career
After graduation from law school, Weber became a law clerk to New York United States District Judge Neal P. McCurn working on criminal and civil cases. When his judge sat by designation on the United States Court of Appeals for the Second Circuit, Weber assisted with criminal and civil appeals in 1998 and 1999. Subsequently, Weber was Special Counsel for Enforcement for more than ten years at the Office of the Comptroller of the Currency, at the United States Department of the Treasury. He followed that up by practicing as Supervisory Counsel and Chief of Enforcement Unit I for the Federal Deposit Insurance Corporation (FDIC), responsible for overseeing all banking enforcement activities and investigations involving state chartered banks and bank failures for the western half of the United States. Weber served as the FDIC's signatory on the $1 billion settlement eliminating the refund anticipation loans product from the nation's banking system.

Securities and Exchange Commission
Weber then became the U.S. Securities and Exchange Commission (SEC) Assistant Inspector General for Investigations at the Office of Inspector General, directing all criminal, civil and administrative investigations into fraud, waste and abuse in SEC programs and operations, and supervising the Office's investigative staff. In this role, he served as the SEC's chief investigator. In January 2012, H. David Kotz, SEC Inspector General during the previous four years, resigned and returned to the private sector as managing director of Gryphon Strategies. His resignation came in the midst of questions as to his conduct, as then-current and former SEC employees had complained that Kotz initiated investigations without credible evidence and unnecessarily tainted people's reputations.

Madoff accusations, cyber compromise, and retaliatory paid leave
In March 2012, Weber alleged improper conduct by Kotz, asserting that Kotz may have had personal relationships that tainted SEC investigations of the Bernard Madoff and R. Allen Stanford Ponzi schemes. Kotz said Weber's accusations were "completely and utterly ludicrous and untrue."
 Despite Kotz's protestations, further investigation proved the allegations were indeed true.

Weber also reported potential "national security" concerns and "possible espionage" by "foreign nationals" related to a case Weber was investigating that "involved unencrypted computer hard drives that contained sensitive stock exchange information." Nevertheless, in May 2012, Weber was placed on administrative paid leave after fellow staff complained that he purportedly spoke openly about wanting to carry a concealed gun at work, and brought a bullet-proof vest to work, even though federal Offices of Inspectors General, including the SEC, regularly carried firearms. He was also banned from entering SEC headquarters. Weber denied those allegations, noting that SEC OIG Special Agents regularly carried firearms. U.S. Senator Charles Grassley (R-Iowa) sent a letter to SEC Chairman Mary Schapiro, asking for a copy of the "security threat evaluation" on the basis of which Weber was banned from the SEC's offices. The SEC refused to provide the supposed threat evaluation against Weber to Congress. Later, it was revealed that the supposed threat evaluation found that Weber was not a threat, and could return to work. The SEC, however, did not return him to work.

Williams report
Weber's allegations against Kotz led the SEC to bring in Inspector General David Williams of the U.S. Postal Service to conduct an independent, outside review. The 2012 Williams report concluded that Kotz had in fact violated ethics rules by overseeing investigations that involved people with whom Kotz had "personal relationships."

In addition, the Williams report looked at separate allegations that Weber had created a hostile work environment at the SEC. It did not find any evidence that Weber's conduct was improper or triggered security concerns.  The report made clear that the allegations of the bullet proof vest were false; the vest belonged to the SEC and was donned as "a joke after Weber's colleagues placed smiley-face stickers on it." SEC OIG staff also previously carried firearms; the USPS OIG report found that without law enforcement and weapons authority, the SEC OIG was unable to protect the rights of witnesses or complainants. The sole discussion of weapons at the SEC was in the context of re-certifying special agents to carry weapons after SEC OIG's certification had lapsed, prior to Weber being hired. The Williams report also documented that the SEC's own supposed threat evaluation of Weber was false, and cleared him to return to work (though it failed to do so). Finally, the Williams report found that Weber's reports concerning deficient SEC computer security had merit.

Whistleblower allegations
Weber claimed SEC officials intended to reprise against him for revealing misconduct within the SEC in the Madoff and Stanford investigations, perjury by Chairman Mary Schapiro in testimony before the United States Senate and House of Representatives, and to delay the filing of reports to Congress on the gross misconduct of William J. Fagan (Chief of Security Services for the SEC), Jeff Heslop (Chief Operating Officer of the SEC), and Weber's investigation into the SEC for exposing potential vulnerabilities of the NYSE and NASDAQ Stock Exchange.

According to Weber, Heslop was the target of at least two OIG investigations, including whether Heslop had improperly steered work to Booz Allen Hamilton. The House Oversight and Government Reform Committee probed the allegations. Chairman Darrell Issa noted in a Thomson Reuters' report that the House investigation about the suspicious and wasteful hiring of the Booz Allen consultants was "broadly compatible" with the Weber lawsuit allegations.

According to Weber, Fagan was engaged in pay to play schemes in hiring private security contractors, as well as substantial nepotism in the hiring of security staff. Weber also alleged that Fagan engaged in a cover up of multiple sexual assaults of guard staff and a female visitor to the SEC who was assaulted on a late night due to insufficient security at the SEC's Union Station headquarters. Fagan then used the same private security contractor hired under the pay to play scheme to supposedly investigate Weber, a direct conflict of interest. The US Postal Service OIG, in their 2012 report, found that Fagan's misconduct violated a number of laws and regulations, including the Standards of Ethical Conduct for Executive Department employees. A subsequent SEC OIG report also found that Fagan engaged in a coverup of sexual assaults and failures to properly screen employees and contractors of the SEC for criminal convictions.

The investigation into the SEC computer security lapses was detailed in an August 30 report by Interim Inspector General Jon Rymer.  His report stated that while there were 28 laptops in question, the outside firm conducted forensic testing only on "several select laptops" to determine if a breach occurred. In response, NYSE Euronext hired former Homeland Security Secretary Michael Chertoff to make sure sensitive exchange data were not breached after U.S. securities regulators left their computers unencrypted. "Everything was on those laptops," said one exchange official who spoke on the condition of anonymity. "You could find the system architecture and technology maps of both the New York Stock Exchange and the Nasdaq, information about their key data centers, their emergency plans. It's virtually everything you need to know if you were a terrorist looking to sabotage the U.S. capital markets."  An SEC spokesman later confirmed that the security lapses identified by Weber did occur.

Dismissal and lawsuit
Weber worked at the SEC until October 31, 2012, when, months after becoming a whistleblower accusing the SEC of significant misconduct in the Madoff and Stanford investigations, cyber compromise of NASDAQ, as well as SEC's most senior management misconduct, he was fired for supposedly unrelated reasons. He sued the SEC in federal court in Washington, D.C., in November 2012, saying he was wrongfully terminated and retaliated against for trying to investigate misconduct at the SEC and for coming forward as a whistleblower. Less than two weeks after Weber's suits were filed, the Chairman of the SEC resigned, followed in short order by the resignations or firing of each senior management official of the SEC, including Heslop, Fagan, and the SEC's General Counsel, Mark Cahn.

Kotz responded to the civil lawsuit saying that: "for some inexplicable reason, my name has been dragged through the mud in the most ludicrous and unbelievable allegations." The SEC said it would "vigorously contest" the lawsuit. Yet, the allegations against Kotz were proven to be true, and the SEC did not contest the lawsuit, or even file an answer. Instead of vigorously contesting the lawsuit as promised, in June 2013, the SEC settled the lawsuits with Weber by paying him, reinstating him from the date of his dismissal, and clearing his personnel and security records.  Weber purportedly received the third largest federal employee whistleblower payment to date. Despite being reinstated, Weber decided not to return to his former position, instead becoming a university faculty member, and growing his forensic investigations practice. In 2014, author Larry Doyle named Weber as one of his "top 5 whistleblowers." On July 30, 2015, Weber was recognized by six United States Senators and one member of the House of Representatives at the First Congressional Celebration of National Whistleblower Appreciation Day. In October 2015, the Syracuse University College of Law named Weber as the one of the first recipients of the new "Syracuse Law Alumni Honors" award for "distinguished achievements."

Post-SEC, military service, law practice, publications, and university teaching

Post SEC
As of August 2021, Weber and his wife Julie Goodwin Weber were principals in Goodwin Weber PLLC. In addition to practicing law, Weber is a forensic accountant, certified fraud examiner and a private investigator. He was a lecturer and the academic director of fraud management programs at Robert H. Smith School of Business, University of Maryland, College Park. At the university, Weber directed the American Bankers Association - Smith School Fraud and Anti-Money Laundering Management Program and taught in the school's executive MBA and online MBA programs. He also taught in the master's accounting program, the graduate certificate in risk, compliance and law, and undergraduate classes. In 2017, Weber taught a course on organized crime involvement in white collar crimes and collaborated with Bernard Madoff on Maryland's fraud curriculum.  After teaching at UMD, Weber became a faculty member at the University of Maryland Global Campus, continuing to teach forensic accounting.  In 2020, Weber became a faculty member at Salisbury University, which is the only University System of Maryland school with a program in fraud and forensic accounting.

Military service
Until 2016, Weber was a Lieutenant Colonel and the appeals officer for the 70th Regiment of the Maryland Army National Guard, and member of the Judge Advocate Corps of the Maryland State Guard.

Journalism and writing
In 2015–2016, as a financial expert for the International Consortium of Investigative Journalists, Weber analyzed a number of loan agreements included among the Panama Papers, a project awarded the Pulitzer Prize for explanatory reporting in 2017. A book was later written about the Panama Papers, Secrecy World, in which Weber was featured.  In 2019, Secrecy World was made into a major motion picture, The Laundromat, for which Weber served as the technical consultant, and played a small cameo. In Fall 2020, Weber assisted the Associated Press in their investigation into how the Venezuelan government avoided US and global sanctions through Asia.  The AP's investigative report was published by more than 300 national and international media outlets including The Washington Post. Since fall 2020, Weber has served as a regular contributor to Pursuit Magazine, a leading e-zine for professional investigators.  Since joining pursuit, he was written columns on the origins of fraud, open source intelligence, fraud in the COVID-19 pandemic,  and the activities of the federal Inspectors General in responding to the pandemic.  He has also hosted webinars and virtual lectures on pandemic fraud. In January 2021, Weber assisted the AP with review of the Congress override of the veto on the National Defense Authorization Act, which contained major money laundering changes to US law. In February 2021, Weber served as an expert for CBS News, which investigated Bank of America's handling of pandemic fraud connected with California Unemployment-issued debit cards. In February 2022, Weber served as an expert for the American Banker and CBS News, each of which continued their investigation into Bank of America's handling of pandemic fraud, as federal regulators including the Office of the Comptroller of the Currency and the Consumer Financial Protection Bureau considered civil penalties against the bank. In March and April 2022, Weber again served as a financial crimes expert for the International Consortium of Investigative Journalists, investigating how professionals such as accountants and lawyers created secrecy for sanctioned Russian oligarchs with deep ties to Vladimir Putin. “We, as the public, rely on these professionals to be the gatekeepers and to do the right thing,” Weber said. “They should vet their clients.” Shortly after the investigation was published, the United States government sanctioned Russian musician Sergey Roldugin and steel tycoon Alexei Mordashov, two subjects of the investigation.  The investigation also resulted in sanctions against all U.S. accounting and consulting firms, prohibiting further work on behalf of any Russian citizen, which became effective in June 2022. As a result of the investigation, in July 2022, the draft National Defense Authorization Act for 2023 inserted language amending U.S. money laundering law to apply to professionals, including lawyers, accountants and art dealers, in an attempt to prohibit improper assistance to Russian oligarchs.

Practice of law
While teaching full time, Weber maintains a limited practice of law. He represented a key witness in the 2017-2019 Special Counsel investigation into Russian Interference.  Weber's client was one of five witnesses granted immunity for testimony before the Special Grand Jury and at the trial of Paul Manafort.  Weber's client also testified against Rick Gates, leading to his guilty plea. More recently, Weber represented the widow and estate of Jeffrey Smith, one of the three police officers to die at or in the aftermath of the 2021 Capitol Riot.  Weber advocated for the award of line of duty death benefits for Officer Smith, along with U.S. Capitol Police Officers Howard Liebengood and Brian Sicknick. In July 2021, Weber petitioned the Government of the District of Columbia to award line of duty death benefits for Washington, DC, Police Officer Jeffrey Smith, as reported by the New York Times.  On August 5, 2021, Weber met with President Biden, Speaker Nancy Pelosi, and United States Senators in the Rose Garden, upon the signing of H.R. 3325, awarding the Congressional Gold Medal to the U.S. Capitol Police and Washington, D.C., Metropolitan Police Officers who lost their lives defending the United States Capitol on January 6, and April 2, 2021, including Weber's client deceased MPD Police Officer Jeffrey Smith.  During the Rose Garden event, Weber pressed the President to award line of duty benefits to his client and Howard Liebengood. On March 7, 2022, Officer Smith's death was ruled to be line of duty, "the sole and direct cause" of the injuries he suffered on January 6, 2021, at the Capitol insurrection.   "This is the first time where someone who has suffered a brain injury, and an emotional injury, has been acknowledged as a line-of-duty death," Weber said. "This will impact widows, widowers, children and parents of everyday heroes who have suffered these injuries in the line of duty."  Weber also advocated for passage of H.R. 6943 and S.3635, the Public Safety Officer Support Act of 2022, which designated traumatic brain injuries, PTSD and other "silent" injuries as line of duty at the federal level.  The bill passed the House 402-17 on May 18, 2022; and unanimously passed the United States Senate on August 1, 2022.  The bill was signed into law by the President on August 17, 2022.

University teaching
Weber is a full time faculty member within the University System of Maryland, and is presently an assistant professor of forensic accounting at Perdue School of Business, Salisbury University.  In May 2016, Weber was awarded the Distinguished Teaching Award at the University of Maryland, College Park, and the teaching recognition award by University of Maryland Global Campus, both for undergraduate teaching.  In 2017, Weber was nominated for the American Accounting Association's Forensic Accounting Section best teaching innovation award.  Weber was also twice nominated for the Stanley J. Drazek Teaching Excellence Award. In addition to teaching, Weber is a Woodrow Wilson Visiting Fellow of the Council of Independent Colleges.  Weber is spearheading Perdue School's new forensic accounting experiential learning program, in which students assist with real financial crime cases on the Eastern Shore of the Chesapeake Bay.  Weber is supervising the students as a special investigator for the Maryland State's Attorney Offices of two counties, and as a Virginia state prosecutor in a neighboring Virginia county. In October 2022, it was announced that Weber was awarded a $2.6 million grant by the U.S. Department of Health and Human Services to further the experiential learning program by focusing on elder financial and high-tech crime, through a variety of fraud-fighting interventions.  One of the interventions being funded is to provide scholarships for students in the fraud program who work on cases, with the aim to increase interest in public service by students at Salisbury University.

See also
List of whistleblowers

References

External links
Goodwin Weber bio

Utica University alumni
Living people
Syracuse University College of Law alumni
Place of birth missing (living people)
People from Gaithersburg, Maryland
American whistleblowers
Year of birth missing (living people)